The Supporters Range is a rugged range of mountains in Antarctica, 40 km long, bordering the eastern side of Mill Glacier, from Keltie Glacier in the north to Mill Stream Glacier in the south.

So named by the New Zealand GSAE (1961–62) because several peaks of the range are named after supporters of Ernest Shackleton's British Antarctic Expedition (1907–09).

the highest mountain being Mount White, which is about 3470m above sea level.

Among the mountains in this range is Mount Iveagh, a 3422-metre peak on the east side of the Beardmore Glacier. Mount Iveagh was discovered by the British Antarctic Expedition and named for Edward Guinness, 1st Earl of Iveagh, of the firm of Guinness, who helped finance the expedition.

Features
Geographical features include:

 Ashworth Glacier
 Jensen Glacier
 Laird Glacier
 Mill Glacier
 Mill Stream Glacier
 Mount Henry Lucy
 Mount Iveagh
 Mount Judd
 Mount Kinsey
 Mount Westminster
 Mount White
 Ranfurly Point
 Scully Terrace
 Snakeskin Glacier

References

Queen Maud Mountains
Mountains of the Ross Dependency
Dufek Coast